Kyle Brandon Butler (born 16 January 1998 in Jamaica) is a Jamaican footballer.

Career

As a youth player, Butler traveled with his brother, Jamaican international Leon Bailey, and father, Craig, to Europe, where they played for the youth teams of Austrian club USK Anif as well K.R.C. Genk in Belgium. After that, he signed for K.R.C. Genk but failed to make an appearance despite consistently scoring for the reserves.

In 2017, he signed for Maltese club St. Andrews.

In 2018, Butler signed for LASK in Austria, before being sent on loan to Juniors OÖ in the Austrian second division.

In 2020, after failing to make an appearance for Austrian second division side SC Austria Lustenau, he formed Dynasty Records.

Personal life

On 30 November 2020, Butler reported an alleged assault on him by his father, Craig. He shared images of an alleged stab wound on social media and claims that he has received physical and mental abuse from his father for 'years'. Butler's father denies the allegations.

References

External links
 

Jamaican footballers
Living people
Association football midfielders
1998 births
St. Andrews F.C. players
Sportspeople from Kingston, Jamaica